Despacio (Spanish for "slow") may refer to:

 "Despacio", a song by Bad Gyal featuring Ms Nina from Slow Wine Mixtape
 "Despacio", a song by Juice and Rauw Alejandro
 "Despacio", a song by Natti Natasha featuring Nicky Jam, Manuel Turizo and Myke Towers
 "Despacio", a song by Nicky Jam featuring Arcángel from Fénix
 "Despacio", a song by Swagger and Rauw Alejandro
 "Despacio", a song by Yandel and Farruko

See also
 Despacito